Sindura Bindu is an Odia romantic love story released on 15 July 1976. This is the debut film of ace director Sisir Misra as director. The film is a gloomy tale of childhood lovers, who separate and unite at the end.

Cast
 Sriram Panda... Akash
 Tripura Misra... Sandhya
 Prashant Nanda... Ajay
 Sujata Anand... Anita
 Ajit Das... Pratap
 Kedar Guru... Sadhu Baba
 Narendra Behera
 Shyamlendu Bhatacharjee
 Anima Pedini

Soundtrack
The music for the film was composed by Prafulla Kar.

Box office
The film was a box office hit and celebrated Silver Jubilee week in various theaters.

Awards
 Orissa State Film Awards 1976
 Best Playback Singer (Male) - Pranab Patnaik

References

External links
 

1976 films
1970s Odia-language films